Ruth Wightman (August 15, 1897 – April 19, 1939) was an American screenwriter and race car driver who was married to the novelist Gouveneur Morris.

Biography 
Ruth, an only child, was born in Jamestown, New York, to John Wightman and Lulu Russell.

Ever the adventurer, she had a passion for flying, and was noted as being one of the first women in the United States to be granted a pilot's license. She also competed in car races in Stockton, California, as a young woman, and was involved in a fatal crash in 1918.

In 1923, she married author Governeur Morris, for whom she had formerly worked as a secretary before beginning a career in the scenario department at Samuel Goldwyn Studio. The pair kept their marriage out of the newspapers for a year, as Morris was still waiting to be granted a divorce from his first wife, Elsie; they then held a second marriage ceremony to seal the deal and comply with California law.

Wightman died at a sanitarium in Alameda, New Mexico, in 1939 after a brief illness. She was survived by her husband; the pair had no children.

Selected filmography 

 The Beautiful Liar (1921)
 The Ace of Hearts (1921)

References 

American women screenwriters
1897 births
1939 deaths
20th-century American women writers
20th-century American screenwriters
Sportspeople from Jamestown, New York
American female racing drivers